Wescape is a proposed development project located in the north-west area of the City of Cape Town, South Africa. The Wescape development, proposed by urban development company communiTgrow, is 3,100 hectares (31 square kilometres) and once completed will reportedly include 200,000 houses, 400 education facilities (schools, crèches and colleges), 370 public service facilities (such as libraries and clinics) and 15 sports complexes.

The companies behind the Wescape development state that it will be worth R140 billion and create 300 000 jobs over 20 years. The developer, communiTgrow, describes the Wescape community development model as incorporating industry, technology, food security, infrastructure, waste processing, energy reduction and production in a holistic manner, minimising environmental impact from urban growth. ‘Green lung’ public spaces will be integrated into residential nodes and community areas.

Location 

Wescape is located to the north-west of Cape Town, 25 kilometres from the central business district (CBD). The site is north of the R304 route and west of the N7 national highway, north-east of the seaside town of Melkbosstrand.

History 

Planning for Wescape began in 2006 as a joint venture between developers, project managers and urban designers. Companies behind the development include Bellandia (property developers), ARG Design (town planners and urban designers responsible for The MyCiTi Bus stations, and Cape Town Station ); Ariya and Target Projects (project management companies behind Cape Town Stadium, the Cape Town International Convention Centre and the Cape Town International Airport upgrade) and Pact Developers.

communiTgrow put forward the plan for Wescape to deal with the demand for houses in Cape Town. Cape Town’s population is growing yearly. In 2001 it was 2,9 million, and by 2011 it had reached 3,7 million. There is already a backlog of homes and it is estimated that between 277,000 and 400,000 people are awaiting subsidised housing.

One of the plan’s supporters is reportedly City of Cape Town's former mayor Patricia De Lille, with the Cape Times newspaper quoting De Lille as being “excited” about the R140 billion development. The City of Cape Town approved the application to extend the urban edge to accommodate Wescape in December 2012.

Project Details 

Wescape plans to have 200,000 homes, housing around 800,000 people and aims integrate all necessary public amenities. Wescape developers have said that the project will provide all the bulk infrastructure required, including water, energy and waste services, and all internal roads. The city will feature around 400 education facilities, 30 health facilities, and 15 sports complexes. There will be shops, factories, parks and public open spaces.

Approach 

Wescape’s plan is based on communiTgrow’s approach to urban development, which identifies six pillars as the foundation of a community, namely Economy, Homes, Education, Governance, Health and Regenerative Ecology. The Pillars co-operate to provide solutions which address multiple challenges in the various sectors of a community, allowing people and the environment to benefit.

Timeline 

According to the proposal, the development would involve 10 phases over the next 20 years with building beginning in 2015 and completed around 2035.

Homes 

The developers of Wescape state that it will consist of different types of homes and a range of unit types. Half of all the homes developed will be affordable for those households who fall into the GAP market (the gap housing market consists of households who typically earn too much to qualify for government subsidised housing, but too little to participate in the current private property market). The other half will be placed on the open market, aimed at households with income levels above the subsidy eligibility bands.

Infrastructure 

Developers have stated Wescape has built provision of bulk services into its economic model and that the private urban development company, communiTgrow, will develop all the bulk services required, including infrastructure for water, energy, waste and all internal roads.

Transport 

The plan for Wescape includes the promotion of walkable neighbourhoods, pedestrian-oriented pathways, non-motorised transport routes, and an internal public transport system. The Integrated Rapid Transit Bus Service which will link Cape Town to Atlantis will also run through the site proposed for Wescape.

Wescape developers have also put forward that the railway line that runs through Cape Town’s Western Growth Corridor to Atlantis will service Wescape once it is converted to a commuter service, although this is yet to be confirmed.

The proposed road networks that will service Wescape include the R27 to Saldhana, along which the IRT runs to Atlantis, the M12 connecting Milnerton to Atlantis and the N7 connecting internationally up the west coast of Africa. In an east-west direction, the northern arm of the R300 will pass over the centre of the Wescape site bringing in traffic from the N1 and Metro-South-East. It will connect with the M12 in a diamond intersection. The R304 from Philadelphia cuts through the northern part of the site and will eventually link all the way across to the R27.

Environmental Impact 

The Wescape developers state that the development is being designed to be responsive to climate change by maximising the re-use of water, utilising solar power and reducing energy consumption through conscious Urban Design and through the use of cutting-edge technologies. Wescape plans also state that it aims to reduce waste to landfill by up to 90%.

The Wescape plans claim that over 20% of the total land area in the development will be given to greening in the form of the central Metropolitan Open Space System (MOSS) which links the biodiversity corridors of the city and runs through the valley system of the site and consists of urban agriculture, forests, civic landscape or bioswales.

Criticism 

Wescape has faced criticism from residents of the nearby town of Melkbosstrand as well as some prominent academics.

Residents of Melkbosstrand 

Residents of Melkbosstrand have objected to the impact Wescape might have on the suburb near to the proposed site. David and Cathy Butler, who live on a smallholding adjacent to where Wescape is to be built, said in a submission to the City of Cape Town that “This development will degenerate into nothing more than a low-cost housing, informal settlement slum, which will impact heavily on the value of property”.

communiTgrow developers have argued against this characterisation of the development, and stated in reply to the Butler’s complaint that they were “speculating on the essence of what Wescape will be”.

Urban Edge 

Wescape has faced criticism due to its location outside of the Urban Edge of the City of Cape Town. Wescape has applied for the urban edge to be shifted to include the proposed development site. Wescape developers have argued that there isn’t enough land closer to the inner city to accommodate the proposed development and that where sufficient vacant land does exist, it is owned by private development companies like Milnerton Estates, who have already earmarked it for developments which will not provide suitable homes for lower income households.

Critics put forward that one of the purposes of this hypothetical border is to protect agricultural land beyond it. Professor Vanessa Watson, of the University of Cape Town’s School of Architecture, Planning and Geomatics, stated that “Given the long-term loss of agricultural land and growing issues of food insecurity, we should be doing everything we can to protect productive agricultural land”. Watson stated that “A 2010 City of Cape Town study showed that even at current low densities there is enough land within the urban edge to accommodate growth until 2021”.

Wescape developers have stated that the land on which the development is located has an arid and exhausted soil system, and that it is no longer productive as farmland.

Nancy Odendaal, senior lecturer in city and regional planning at the University of Cape Town stated that the idea of a clearly delineated urban edge for Cape Town is important because it is the most sustainable option and will be better served by transport infrastructure. Because of this, it makes more sense to house people in existing urban areas by filling up vacant land before developing the city outwards.

Distance from Cape Town 

The location of Wescape has also been questioned. The site is located 25 kilometres from the Central Business District (CBD) of the City of Cape Town, and critics put forward that this distance will locate people away from jobs in the city, and residents will be faced with high transport costs.

Wescape developers claim that, much like the towns of Bellville, Somerset West and Muizenberg, the Wescape development will not depend on the CBD to satisfy the needs of residents. Other commentators have argued that integration of the city is not only about distance, and that Wescape would support a more efficient public transport system.

Koeberg Nuclear Power Station 

As is already the case with parts of Melkbosstrand, Blouberg and Atlantis, the Wescape development would be within the 5 km to 16 km Urgent Protective Action Planning Zone of Koeberg Nuclear Power Station and concerns have been raised about the speed at which an  evacuation could take place in case of an emergency.

ComminiTgrow has said it is “fully aware” that a nuclear regulatory evacuation model and assessment would be required before development rights could be granted  and that it would provide a suitable evacuation plan and that the relevant plans and guidelines are being factored into the spatial and movement design of Wescape.

External links 
 Wescape
 communiTgrow

References 

Cape Town
Urban development